Elysius melaleuca is a moth of the family Erebidae. It was described by Felder and Rogenhofer in 1874. It is found in Colombia.

References

melaleuca
Moths described in 1874
Moths of South America